Elise Wood is a jazz flautist.

Biography
Wood studied classical flute in Philadelphia. In the 1970s, she moved from there to New York. There, she played in jazz groups, including with bassist Vishna Wood. They married, but were leading separate lives by the early 1980s.

From 1983, Wood was frequently a member of groups led by pianist John Hicks. As a duo, they played mostly jazz, but also some classical music. They formed a business partnership – John Hicks-Elise Wood, Inc. – and toured the US, Europe and Japan in the 1980s. The couple married in 2001. Her first album as (co-)leader was Luminous, on which she played C and alto flute. A further album co-led with Hicks was Beautiful Friendship, recorded in 2000.

Discography

As leader/co-leader
Luminous (Nilva, 1985–88)
Beautiful Friendship (HiWood, 2000)

As sidewoman
With John Hicks
In Concert (Theresa, 1984)
Single Petal of a Rose (Mapleshade, 1992)
In the Mix (Landmark, 1994)
Piece for My Peace (Landmark, 1996)
Trio + Strings (Mapleshade, 1997)
Sweet Love of Mine (HighNote, 2006)

References

Bibliography

Jazz flautists
Mapleshade Records artists